Minerva's Shrine is a shrine to the Roman goddess Minerva in Edgar's Field, Handbridge, Chester, England. It is recorded in the National Heritage List for England as a designated Grade I listed building. The shrine dates from the early 2nd century and is carved into the face of a sandstone quarry. It is the only monument of its kind in Western Europe that remains in its original location. It is protected by a 19th-century stone surround with a hood, which was refurbished in the late 20th century. The carving has weathered over the centuries and has also been damaged by human activity. Next to the shrine is an opening into the rock face which is possibly a natural fissure that has been enlarged and which is known as Edgar's Cave.

The shrine stands beside the route of the old main Roman road into the fortress of Deva from the south. Minerva was the Roman goddess of war, knowledge, and craftsmanship. She is often depicted with her attributes of helmet, shield, breastplate, and spear, but in this instance she is shown in a simplified form, standing in a representation of a temple.  The Roman quarry, together with Edgar's Field and the image of Minerva, is a Scheduled Monument.

A cast of the shrine is kept in the Grosvenor Museum, in Chester.

See also

List of Scheduled Monuments in Cheshire dated to before 1066
Grade I listed buildings in Cheshire West and Chester

References

External links

 Illustrated article on Minerva's Shrine'
The Minerva Shrine

Grade I listed buildings in Chester
Roman sites in Cheshire
Roman religious sites in England
Minerva's Shrine
Archaeological sites in Cheshire
Minerva's Shrine
Scheduled monuments in Cheshire
Religious buildings and structures in the United Kingdom
2nd-century religious buildings and structures
Temples of Minerva
Shrines
Religious buildings and structures in England